Avtozavodskaya Line may refer to:
 Aŭtazavodskaja line, Minsk
 Avtozavodskaya line (Nizhny Novgorod Metro)